Africanfuturism: An Anthology is an Africanfuturism anthology edited by Nigerian author Wole Talabi. It contains eight works of short fiction an introduction written by Wole Talabi. It was published by Brittle Paper in October 2020.

Contents 
The anthology consists of eight original works of Africanfuturism short fiction's. A reprint of Nnedi Okorafor's definition of Africanfuturism was included.
 Introduction by Wole Talabi
 "Egoli" by T. L. Huchu
 "Sunrise" by Nnedi Okorafor
 "Yat Madit" by Dilman Dila
 "Rainmaker" by Mazi Nwonwu
 "Behind Our Irises" by Tlotlo Tsamaase
 "Fort Kwame" by Derek Lubangakene
 "Fruit of the Calabash" by Rafeeat Aliyu
 "Lekki Lekki" by Mame Bougouma Diene

Background 
The anthology was published during the ten years anniversary of Brittle Paper. The anthology is the first anthology that "...directly engage with the idea of Africanfuturism." The name of the anthology was inspired by the subgenre coined by Nnedi Okorafor.

References 

2020 anthologies
Nigerian anthologies
Science fiction anthologies
African diaspora literature
Africanfuturism
2020s science fiction works